Kopanie may refer to:
Kopanie, Greater Poland Voivodeship, a settlement in Greater Poland Voivodeship, Poland
Kopanie, Opole Voivodeship, a village in Opole Voivodeship, Poland